The Donev government is the ninety-seventh Cabinet of Bulgaria. It took office on 2 August 2022, after being nominated by President Rumen Radev to solve the political crisis that led to the fall of the Petkov Government and the calling of a snap election for October 2. It is a caretaker government chaired by prime minister Galab Donev.

Cabinet 

|

|
|-
|Health Minister
|Asen Medzhidiev
|Independent
|
|-
|Education Minister
|Sasho Penov
|Independent
|
|-
|Agriculture and Foods Minister
|Yavor Gechev
|BSP
|
|-
|Deputy Prime Minister for Economic Policies and Transport and Communications Minister
|Hristo Alexiev
|Independent
|
|-
|Environment and Waters Minister
|Rositsa Karamfilova-Blagova
|Independent
|
|-
|Energy Minister
|Rosen Hristov
|Independent
|
|-
|Tourism Minister
|Ilin Dimitrov
|PP
|
|-
|Economy Minister
|Nikola Stoyanov
|Independent
|
|-
|Regional Development Minister
|Ivan Shishkov
|Independent
|
|-
|Culture Minister
|Velislav Minekov
|Independent
|
|-
|Youth and Sports Minister
|Vesela Lecheva
|BSP
|
|-
|Minister of e-Government
|Georgi Todorov
|Independent
|
|-
|Minister of Innovation and Growth
|Alexander Pulev
|Independent
|
|}

References 

 
 
 

Politics of Bulgaria
Cabinets established in 2022
2022 establishments in Bulgaria
Current governments